The Lonely One or Lonely One may refer to:

Film and television
 "The Lonely Ones", 1964 episode of Ben Casey
 "The Lonely One", 1992 episode of The Ray Bradbury Theatre
 "The Lonely Ones", 1961 episode of Dr. Kildare

Music

Albums
 The Lonely One..., 1959 album by jazz pianist Bud Powell
 The Lonely One, 2014 EP by Dana Williams
 Lonely Ones, album by Graham Colton

Songs
 "Lonely One", song by Nariaki Obukuro
 "The Lonely One", song by Nat King Cole from After Midnight
 "The Lonely One", song by Duane Eddy
 "The Lonely One", song by Alice Deejay
 "(I'm) The Lonely One", song written by Gordon Mills, recorded by Cliff Richard and Tom Jones
 "Lonely One", song by Milow from Modern Heart
 "Lonely One", song by Swollen Members from Armed to the Teeth